Mason–Drennen House, also known as the Martin Bibb Mason House, Drennen-Mason House, and Drennen Spring, is a historic home located near Drennen, Nicholas County, West Virginia.  The main portion of the house was built about 1818 and 1835, and the rear wing was added about 1910.  It is a two-story, side gable with a rear gable, two-story wing of log and frame construction.  It features a full-length, two-story porch on the front of the house.  Also on the property are two contributing barns.

It was listed on the National Register of Historic Places in 1998.

References

Houses on the National Register of Historic Places in West Virginia
Federal architecture in West Virginia
Houses completed in 1860
Houses in Nicholas County, West Virginia
National Register of Historic Places in Nicholas County, West Virginia
Log buildings and structures on the National Register of Historic Places in West Virginia